Asakent is a rural locality (a selo) in Kontsilsky Selsoviet, Khivsky District, Republic of Dagestan, Russia. The population was 108 as of 2010.

Geography 
Asakent is located 23 km east of Khiv (the district's administrative centre) by road. Kontsil is the nearest rural locality.

Country
Asakent is in Russia

References 

Rural localities in Khivsky District